Embrace Kids may refer to:
Embrace Kids (film), documentary film from Body Image Movement
Embrace Kids Foundation, organisation supported by Rutgers University dance marathon